Hugh T. Johnson (25 April 1946 - 4 June 2015) was an Irish cinematographer and director of film and commercials known for his collaborations with Ridley Scott and his brother Tony, working on films like The Duellists, The Hunger, G.I. Jane, and Kingdom of Heaven.

Filmography 
As cinematographer

As director
 Chill Factor (1999)

Other credits

References

External links 

1946 births
2015 deaths
Irish cinematographers
Irish film directors
People from Navan
Television commercial directors